Castelldefels is a Rodalies de Catalunya railway station serving Castelldefels, in Catalonia, Spain.

The station has five platforms: platforms 1 and 2 are the through platforms, platform 4 is for trains terminating or starting at the station, and platforms 3 and 5 are bay platforms, sometimes used by trains at the beginning or end of service.

The stations on either side are Gavà (heading towards Barcelona) and Platja de Castelldefels (heading away from Barcelona).

References

External links

 Castelldefels listing at Rodalies de Catalunya website
 Information and photos of the station at trenscat.cat 

Transport in Castelldefels
Railway stations in Baix Llobregat
Railway stations in Spain opened in 1881
Rodalies de Catalunya stations